Juan Uslé Oceja (born 1954) is a Spanish contemporary painter. His work varies between abstraction and figurative representation. In 2002, he received the Premio Nacional de Artes Plásticas, a national arts prize awarded by the Ministerio de Cultura of Spain. He works both in New York City and in Saro in Cantabria.

Early life and education
Uslé was born on December 19, 1954 in Santander, Cantabria in northern Spain. He studied at the Real Academia de Bellas Artes de San Carlos de Valencia, in Valencia in eastern Spain, between 1973 to 1977. Uslé is married to artist Victoria Civera, who he has occasionally collaborated with in work. Together they have a daughter, Vicky Uslé (born 1981) who is also a painter.

Uslé moved to New York City with his family in the 1987. He lives between New York City and Saro, Cantabria.

Uslé's first art exhibition in the United States was in 1988 at Farideh Cadot Gallery in New York City. Exhibitions of his work include Nudos Y Rizomas (2010), Es Baluard, Museu d'Art Modern i Contemporani de Palma, Mallorca; and Notes on Soñe que Revelabas (2019), Ibiza.

References

Further reading 

 Barry Schwabsky (2016), Juan Uslé: The Blind Entrance, Ediciones Polígrafa. English: ; Spanish: 
 Stephan Berg, Ángel González and Raphael Rubinstein (2014), Juan Uslé: Soñé que revelabas, Kunstmuseum Bonn/Centro Galego de Arte Contemporánea.

External links
Brooklyn Rail Juan Uslé and John Yau

1954 births
Living people
People from Santander, Spain
Artists from Cantabria
20th-century Spanish painters
20th-century Spanish male artists
Spanish male painters
21st-century Spanish painters
21st-century Spanish male artists